David Herbert Samuel, 3rd Viscount Samuel OBE (8 July 1922 – 7 October 2014) was an Anglo-Israeli chemist and neurobiologist.

Samuel was the son of Edwin Samuel, 2nd Viscount Samuel, and the grandson of the British-Jewish diplomat Herbert Samuel, 1st Viscount Samuel. He was a second cousin of Rosalind Franklin. He was educated at Balliol College, Oxford, and served in the Royal Artillery in the Second World War in India, Burma and Sumatra, reaching the rank of captain. He then commenced a distinguished academic career, and was one of the founding fathers of the faculty of chemistry at the Weizmann Institute of Science. Late in his career, his scientific interests moved from physical chemistry (particularly chemical kinetics) to neurobiology. He was the author of over 300 publications as well as the book Memory: How We Use It, Lose It and Can Improve It.

From 14 November 1978 until 11 November 1999 he was a member of the British House of Lords, although his only appearance in the official record, Hansard, was taking his oath in 1995. This made him the only Israeli who ever served in this capacity.

References

1922 births
2014 deaths
Jewish chemists
British Jews
David
Officers of the Order of the British Empire
Israeli Jews
Israeli physical chemists
Academic staff of Weizmann Institute of Science
3
Alumni of Balliol College, Oxford
Royal Artillery officers
Jewish scientists
British Army personnel of World War II
British emigrants to Israel

Samuel